The following is a list of players and who appeared in at least one game for the New York Metropolitans Major League Baseball franchise of the American Association from  through .



B
Ed Bagley
Buck Becannon
Steve Behel
Steve Brady
Cal Broughton

C
Bill Collins
Peter Connell
Sam Crane
Clarence Cross
Doug Crothers
Joe Crotty
Ed Cushman

D
Jim Donahue

E
Dude Esterbrook

F
Bill Fagan
Tom Forster
Elmer Foster

G
Joe Gerhardt

H
Charlie Hall
Frank Hankinson
Mortimer Hogan
Bill Holbert
Sadie Houck

J
Jones (third baseman)
Charley Jones

K
Tim Keefe
Ed Kennedy
Tom Kinslow
Jimmy Knowles

L
Jack Lynch

M
Fred Mauer
Al Mays
Tom McLaughlin
James McMullin
John Meister
Jon Morrison
Tony Murphy

N
Candy Nelson

O
Darby O'Brien
Tom O'Brien
Fred O'Neill
John O'Rourke
Dave Orr
Henry Oxley

P
Charlie Parsons
Gracie Pierce
Dick Pierson
Lip Pike

R
Paul Radford
Joe Reilly
Charlie Reipschlager
Chief Roseman
Cyclone Ryan

S
John Shaffer
Andy Sommers

T
Dasher Troy

W
Stump Weidman

Z
Chief Zimmer

External links
Baseball Reference

Major League Baseball all-time rosters